Paul Woldu (born September 14, 1984) is a former professional Canadian football cornerback. He was drafted by the Montreal Alouettes in the fifth round of the 2008 CFL Draft where he spent four years with the team. He played CIS football for the Saskatchewan Huskies football team.

Early years 
Woldu was born in Regina, Saskatchewan, and attended Dr. Martin LeBoldus High School. He played junior football with the Regina Thunder and earned an invitation as a non-roster player to the Saskatchewan Roughriders 2006 training camp, where he participated in a pre-season game before being released.

Upon his release from the Riders, Woldu played CIS football for the Saskatchewan Huskies for the 2006 and 2007 seasons, assisting them to the 2006 Hardy Cup and Mitchell Bowl championships and where he was named to the 2007 All-Canadian first-team. Woldu has won 3 Grey Cups in his career, two with the Montreal Alouettes in 2009 and 2010, and one with the Saskatchewan Roughriders in 2013..

References

External links 
Saskatchewan Roughriders bio 

1984 births
Living people
Sportspeople from Regina, Saskatchewan
Players of Canadian football from Saskatchewan
Canadian football defensive backs
Saskatchewan Huskies football players
Saskatchewan Roughriders players
Montreal Alouettes players
Canadian Junior Football League players